The 1960 Brisbane Rugby League season was the 52nd season of the Brisbane Rugby League premiership. Eight teams from across Brisbane competed for the premiership, which culminated in Northern Suburbs defeating Fortitude Valley 18-5 to claim their second consecutive premiership.

Ladder

Finals 

Source:

References 

1960 in rugby league
1960 in Australian rugby league
Rugby league in Brisbane